Ross MacIver (born 28 February 1999) is a Scottish professional footballer who plays as a forward for Scottish League One club Alloa Athletic. He previously played for Ross County, Motherwell and Partick Thistle, and has spent time on loan at Wick Academy, Forfar Athletic, Elgin City, and Greenock Morton.

Career

Ross County
MacIver came through the Ross County Academy and was part of the Ross County Under-20s team that won the 2016–17 SPFL Development League for the first time in the club's history. He made his first team debut in the 2018–19 Scottish Challenge Cup third round against Montrose coming on for the last 13 minutes of the match and taking home the man of the match reward for his outstanding efforts.

Loans
In January 2017, MacIver was loaned out to Highland Football League Club Wick Academy until the end of the season. On 26 January 2018, along with teammate Russell Dingwall, he was loaned to Scottish League One team Forfar Athletic until the end of the season. MacIver went on to score one goal in ten games for the club which caught the attention of premier league sides such as Aberdeen and Kilmarnock who were in desperate need of a predator type attacker.

In February 2019, MacIver joined Elgin City on loan for the remainder of the season.

Motherwell
Ahead of the 2019–20 season, having been released by Ross County, MacIver signed for Motherwell. He made his debut as a substitute on 26 December 2019, away to his former club Ross County, scoring Motherwell's equalising goal in a 2–1 win. This ended up being the only goal of his senior Motherwell career. In other performances he ran around efficiently which was highly commended by the Steelmen faithful .

MacIver joined Greenock Morton on a season-long loan in September 2020, but was recalled by Motherwell in January 2021. He was then loaned to Partick Thistle in March 2021. MacIver scored his first goal for Thistle in a 2–0 win away to Dumbarton, which sent Thistle top of League One.

Partick Thistle
MacIver joined Partick Thistle on a permanent basis after winning the League One title with the club, signing a one year deal. On 28 February 2022, MacIver joined Scottish League One side Alloa Athletic on loan for the remainder of the 2021–22 season.

Alloa Athletic
After a successful loan spell MacIver joined Alloa Athletic on a permanent deal after being released by Partick Thistle.

Career statistics

Honours
Partick Thistle
Scottish League One: 2020–21

References

Living people
1999 births
Association football forwards
Footballers from Inverness
Ross County F.C. players
Scottish footballers
Scottish Professional Football League players
Wick Academy F.C. players
Forfar Athletic F.C. players
Elgin City F.C. players
Motherwell F.C. players
Greenock Morton F.C. players
Partick Thistle F.C. players
Alloa Athletic F.C. players